Two male athletes from Dominican Republic competed at the 1996 Summer Paralympics in Atlanta, United States.

Medalists

The following Dominican athlete won medal at the games.

See also
Dominican Republic at the Paralympics
Dominican Republic at the 1996 Summer Olympics

References 

Nations at the 1996 Summer Paralympics
1996
Summer Paralympics